The Tennessee High Energy Physics Group is located at the University of Tennessee in Knoxville, TN. It has greatly benefited over the years from its close proximity and special relationship with Oak Ridge National Laboratory (ORNL). Members of the group are involved in the BaBar collaboration, CMS, E-144, E687, and KamLAND among others.

See also
Particle physics

External links
Homepage of the Tennessee High Energy Physics Group
BaBar Homepage
CMS Homepage
E-144 Homepage
E687 Homepage
KamLAND Tennessee Homepage

University of Tennessee